The Varaždin Generalate, also known as the Windische Grenze ("Wendian/Wendish [Slavic] Border") in German, was a Habsburg monarchy Military Frontier province centred in Warasdin (Varaždin), Kingdom of Croatia within Habsburg Monarchy, that existed between 1531 and the 19th century.

The border command was established by Ferdinand I, Holy Roman Emperor in 1531. By the 1560s the Habsburgs established a frontier defense system, made up of six main Grenzgeneralat (captain-generalcies) in the Military Frontier in Hungary and Croatia, each commanded by captain generals; the one centred in Varaždin was after 1578 known as the Wendish-Bajcsavár captain-generalcy. Until the Long Turkish War, the Military Frontier's defense system had two centers, Karlovac and Varaždin. During the war, the area around the generalate was deserted.

The Statuta Valachorum (1630), a decree of privileges to the Orthodox and some Greek Catholic Vlachs  and (Serb) refugee community, was in effect in the generalate. A rebellion broke out in the generalate in 1632, the Frontiersmen (Grenzer) rose up against local Austrian governors; the rebellion was suppressed, and knez (count) Marko Bogdanović and harambaša Smiljan Vujica (or Smoljan Vujić) were executed. A rebellion broke out in the generalate in 1665–66 when Frontiersmen under Stefan Osmokruhović rose up against the Austrian officers, after the rights of the frontiersmen had been compromised.

In 1737 the Military Frontier was re-organized, and the Varaždin general command included the two regiments of Križevci and Đurđevac. The area was 1871 eventually ceded to the Habsburg Kingdom of Croatia.

Commanders
"Oberst der Windischen Grenze",  1616
Sigmund Friedrich von Trauttmansdorf, "Oberst der Windischen Grenze",  1626

References

Military Frontier
1531 establishments in Europe
16th century military history of Croatia
17th-century military history of Croatia
18th-century military history of Croatia
19th-century military history of Croatia